Conospermum boreale is a shrub endemic to Western Australia.

It blooms between August and November producing cream-white flowers.

It is found on areas of laterite in the west coast areas of the Mid West and Wheatbelt regions of Western Australia from Northampton to Wanneroo where it grows in sandy soils.

References

External links

Eudicots of Western Australia
boreale
Endemic flora of Western Australia
Plants described in 1995